Nughedu San Nicolò is a comune (municipality) in the Province of Sassari in the Italian region Sardinia, located about  northwest of Cagliari and about  southeast of Sassari.

Nughedu San Nicolò borders the following municipalities: Anela, Bono, Bonorva, Bultei, Ittireddu, Ozieri, Pattada.

References

Cities and towns in Sardinia